An election to City and County of Swansea Council was held on 4 May 2017 as part of wider local elections across Wales. The election was preceded by the 2012 election. Labour maintained control of the authority.

The next full council elections took place in May 2022.

Summary of results

|}

Ward results
The following results were announced following the elections. In the case of wards electing more than one councillor the percentage figures reflect the number of ballot papers issued rather than the total number of votes.

Bishopston (one seat)

Independent Keith Marsh lost the seat he had held for eighteen years.

Bonymaen (two seats)

Castle (four seats)

Clydach (two seats)

Cockett (four seats)

Cwmbwrla (three seats)

Dunvant (two seats)

Fairwood (one seat)

Gorseinon (one seat)

Gower (one seat)

Sitting member Richard Lewis switched back from the Lib Dems to the Independents.

Gowerton (one seat)

Killay North (one seat)

Killay South (one seat)

Kingsbridge (one seat)

Landore (two seats)

Llangyfelach (one seat)

Llansamlet (four seats)

Lower Loughor (one seat)

Mawr (one seat)

Mayals (one seat)

Morriston (five seats)

Mynyddbach (three seats)

Newton (one seat)

Oystermouth (one seat)
The previous Conservative candidate stood as an Independents@Swansea candidate.

Penclawdd (one seat)

Penderry (three seats)

Penllergaer (one seat)

Pennard (one seat)

Penyrheol (two seats)

Pontarddulais (two seats)

Sketty (five seats)

St Thomas (two seats)

Townhill (three seats)

Uplands (four seats)

Upper Loughor (one seat)

West Cross (two seats)

* = sitting councillor in this ward prior to election

By-elections

Castle

Llansamlet

References

2017
Swansea
21st century in Swansea